Dhiravida Telungar Munnetra Kazhagam (DTMK) (Dravidian Telugu Progressive Federation) is a political party in Tamil Nadu, India. The party general secretary is Dr. C.M.K. Reddy and the party president and founder is G. Kamatchi Naidu.

DTMK works for the interests of the Telugu-speaking minority in the state. The party demanded reservations for Telugu speakers in the state administration and possibilities for Telugu medium schooling.

Political parties in Tamil Nadu
Political parties with year of establishment missing